Mount Lawit is a mountain in Terengganu and has an elevation of 1,519 metres, which makes it the highest mountain in the state. Mount Lawit is situated northeast of Gunong Batil, and northwest of Sungai Susu Dara. Both locations are located in Besut district in Malaysia.

See also 
 List of mountains of Malaysia

References 

 Mountains of Terengganu